Thomas Tomkins was a Welsh composer.

Thomas Tomkins may also refer to:

Thomas Tomkins (martyr) (died 1555), English Protestant martyr
Thomas Tomkins (calligrapher) (1743–1816), English calligrapher
Thomas Tomkins (MP) (c.1605–1674), English politician